Julia C. Addington (June 13, 1829 – September 21, 1875) was an American elected official in Iowa. She was the first woman elected to public office in Iowa, and may have been the first woman elected to public office in the United States.

Life
Addington was the daughter of William. H. Addington Sr. and Alvira Potter. She was born in New York state. She came to Iowa from Wisconsin with her family in 1863 and taught school in Cedar Falls, Waterloo, Des Moines and at the Cedar Valley Seminary in Osage. Addington was elected Superintendent of Schools for Mitchell County in 1869.  She had been acting school superintendent just prior to the election, completing the term of the previous holder of that position. Addington was elected as part of the "Bolter" faction of the Republican Party, who favoured Mitchell as the county seat. She received exactly the same number of votes as Republican candidate Milton N. Browne and the election was settled by flipping a coin. Because she was a woman, her election was not universally accepted, even though the Iowa attorney general Henry O'Connor ruled that her election was legal since there was no explicit requirement in the law for a candidate to be male. During her time in office, 17 new schools were built. She retired for health reasons in 1871.

Addington died at home in Stacyville at the age of 46.

References 

1829 births
1875 deaths
People from Mitchell County, Iowa
Educators from New York (state)
County officials in Iowa
School superintendents in Iowa
Women in Iowa politics
19th-century American politicians
Schoolteachers from Iowa
19th-century American educators
Iowa Republicans
19th-century American women politicians
19th-century American women educators